Leisinger is a surname. Notable people with the surname include:

Elisabeth Leisinger (1864–1913), German dramatic soprano
Klaus M. Leisinger (born 1947), Swiss social scientist and economist
Ulrich Leisinger (born 1964), German musicologist

See also
Leininger